Bademli Dam is a dam in Burdur Province, Turkey, built between 1987 and 1997.

See also
List of dams and reservoirs in Turkey

External links
DSI

Dams in Burdur Province
Dams completed in 1997